Dark Is the Way, Light Is a Place is the fifth studio album by American alternative rock band Anberlin, their second album released through major label Universal Republic, on September 7, 2010. The band recorded the album in Nashville, at Blackbird Studios with Grammy Award-winning producer Brendan O'Brien.

Production 

The band entered Blackbird Studios, Nashville, to begin recording the album in March 2010. It was announced on March 3 that the band would be working with Grammy Award- winning producer Brendan O'Brien, who has worked with the likes of Pearl Jam and Rage Against the Machine. The band was unsure which producer to select for the album, they were however approached by O'Brien. O'Brien had followed Anberlin's career after being introduced to their music by his daughter.

The album title is a reference to the Dylan Thomas work Poem On His Birthday. The album examines themes of battles in life and love. Lead singer Stephen Christian states that "Love is a friction, a chemistry... We need to fight it out in a good way, not with threats of leaving, but to, in love, find an understanding."

The artwork for the album is a charcoal on paper drawing by artist Michael Zavros, created in 2006.

Promotion 

The first single of the album, "Impossible," went to radio on July 12.
“We Owe This to Ourselves,” another track from the album, was the main song used for the 2010 ESPN’s X-Games, Shift 2: Unleashed, and as part of Tony Hawk: Shred soundtrack.
"To the Wolves" was used during the 2010 season of NBC Sunday Night Football while "You Belong Here" was featured on commercials for season 10 of American Idol.

When asked about the possible impact of the new album, Stephen replied 'I feel like we're on the brink of something... either world domination or destruction, but either way we're on the brink'. He later revealed that the band believed that "this is the best record that we can ever accomplish," saying the band was "absolutely in our element on this record."

Release 

The album debuted at No. 9 on the Billboard 200 chart, selling 31,000 units in its first week. It also opened at No. 1 on Billboard's Christian Albums chart, No. 2 on Digital Albums, No. 4 on Rock Albums, No. 4 on Alternative Albums, and No. 9 on Tastemaker Albums.

Critical reception

Dark Is the Way, Light Is a Place garnered generally positive reception from music critics. The review aggregator website Metacritic gives a weighted average rating to an album based upon the selected independent mainstream reviews it utilizes, and the album has a Metascore of a 71 out of 100 based on eight reviews.

At AllMusic, Gregory Heaney rated the album three-and-a-half stars out of five, indicating how the slower tempos on songs such as 'Take Me (As You Found Me)' will "ultimately prove more rewarding in the long run." Faye Lewis of Rock Sound rated the album an eight out of ten, remarking how the band gets to "dabble with a more interesting, darker edge that borders on Circa Survive." At Alternative Press, Evan Lucy rated the album four stars out of five, observing how the band ""allow Stephen Christian's strong lyricism and impassioned vocals to take center stage to deliver some of his finest performances yet." In addition, Lacy writes that "Dark Is The Way, Light Is A Place is largely proof that what Anberlin might now lack in immediate catchiness, they more than make up for in composure." At Q, they rated the album four stars out of five, stating how "The grandstanding result sounds like U2 if Bono had decided tattoos, obscure piercings and the occasional sore-throated growl were the way forward."

Drew Beringer of AbsolutePunk rated the album a 90 out of 100-percent, highlighting how the release contains "engaging rock and roll album anyone can relate to" that also "will serve as the perfect companion." At Kerrang!, they rated the album three stars out of five, saying how Anberlin with respect to this release "get it right, returning to form with a combination of heartfelt bombast, big choruses and bona fide hooks." Adam Thomas of Sputnikmusic rated the album four stars out of five, stating how the release is no masterpiece but still further solidifies the band "at the top of the US radio-rock universe." At Mojo, they rated the album two stars out of five, cautioning how "Listeners outside their target teen demographic will find all this painfully sincere emoting pretty joyless." Essi Berelian over at Classic Rock rated the album a six out of ten.

Doug Van Pelt of HM Magazine rated the album four stars, observing how it sound exactly like an Anberlin release with "Happy, snappy rhythms cascade up and down energetically while Stephen Christian's melodic voice crest the top of pretty much each and every song like thick cavity-inducing frosting." At Cross Rhythms, Ewan Jones rated the album eight squares out of ten, remarking how the music "grabs you by the throat and demands that you listen." Roger Gelwicks of Jesus Freak Hideout rated the album four stars out of five, indicating how the release "indeed still feels a little short, and with one notably inferior track in the mix, it certainly isn't a perfect album." Also, Jesus Freak Hideout's Jen Rose rated the album four stars out of five, stating how the release felt short in terms of duration, but the music comes "dangerously close to at least matching it as both a mature step forward and a reminder to fans why they fell for this band in the first place." At New Release Tuesday, Jonathan Francesco rated the album a perfect five stars, highlighting how "It's a stunningly amazing album from start to finish, with not a drop of filler to be found anywhere."

At Melodic, Tom Spinelli rated the album three-and-a-half stars out of five, stating how the band "were really [into] their element on this record", which is why "It definitely has a mix of all their records on this one and all the classic Anberlin sound you love to hear", and it "will open up the boundaries" for the group. Eric Pettersson of Indie Vision Music rated the album four stars out of five, writing how it is "still the same style, but better than ever." At BLARE, Leah Beresford rated the album three-and-a-half stars out of five, writing that the release "reveals how dedication and perseverance are two key ingredients in spawning something great." Christian Music Zine's Tyler Hess rated the album a perfect five stars, stating how the music is "worth it" because it "is a classic Anberlin album with all the fixins to whet your appetite".

Track listing

Personnel 

 Stephen Christian – lead vocals, keyboards
 Joseph Milligan – lead guitar, vocals
 Christian McAlhaney – rhythm guitar, vocals
 Deon Rexroat – bass guitar
 Nathan Young – drums, percussion

Production
 Brendan O'Brien - production, engineering, string arrangements, mixing

Chart performance

Album

Singles

References

Anberlin albums
2010 albums
Republic Records albums
Albums produced by Brendan O'Brien (record producer)